The eighth season of Criminal Minds premiered on CBS on September 26, 2012. The series was renewed on March 14, 2012.

In Canada, season eight aired one day earlier on CTV than on CBS in the United States.

Cast
On February 15, 2012, Deadline Hollywood reported that Paget Brewster (Emily Prentiss) would leave the show once season seven was over. All other main cast members had secured deals for the season. On June 13, 2012, CBS announced that Jeanne Tripplehorn would join the cast of the show.

Main 
 Joe Mantegna as Supervisory Special Agent David Rossi (BAU Senior Agent)
 Shemar Moore as Supervisory Special Agent Derek Morgan (BAU Agent)
 Matthew Gray Gubler as Supervisory Special Agent Dr. Spencer Reid (BAU Agent)
 A. J. Cook as Supervisory Special Agent Jennifer "JJ" Jareau (BAU Agent)
 Kirsten Vangsness as Technical Analyst Penelope Garcia (BAU Technical Analyst & Co-Communications Liaison)
 Jeanne Tripplehorn as Supervisory Special Agent Dr. Alex Blake (BAU Agent)
 Thomas Gibson as Supervisory Special Agent Aaron "Hotch" Hotchner (BAU Unit Chief & Co-Communications Liaison)

Recurring 
 Jayne Atkinson as Supervisory Special Agent Erin Strauss (BAU Section Chief)
 Beth Riesgraf as Maeve Donovan
 Mekhai Andersen as Henry LaMontagne
 Nicholas Brendon as Kevin Lynch
 Cade Owens as Jack Hotchner
 Bellamy Young as Beth Clemmons
 Josh Stewart as William "Will" LaMontagne Jr.
 Skipp Sudduth as Stan Gordinski
 Mark Hamill as John Curtis / The Replicator

Episodes

Ratings

Home media

References

General references

External links

Criminal Minds
2012 American television seasons
2013 American television seasons